The 2013 Scandinavian Touring Car Championship was the third Scandinavian Touring Car Championship season. The season started at Ring Knutstorp on 4 May and ends on 21 September at Mantorp Park. It is the first year of TTA – Racing Elite League silhouette regulations in the series following the merge of the STCC and TTA at the end of the 2012 seasons. Fredrik Ekblom goes into the championship as reigning champion.

Teams and drivers

As the cars used during the 2012 STCC season were banned, major teams such as NIKA Racing (Chevrolet), Kristoffersson Motorsport and IPS (Volkswagen) did not join the merged championship. All teams were Swedish-registered.

Race calendar and results
All rounds were held in Sweden.

Championship standings

Drivers' Championship

Manufacturers' Championship

References

External links
 

2013 in motorsport
2013 in Swedish sport